Spaulding Square is a neighborhood in Los Angeles, California.

History
Spaulding Square is named after California architect Albert Starr Spaulding, who purchased the area and subdivided it in 1914.  It a neighborhood of modest homes built between 1916 and 1921. 
Many of the early residents were actors and technicians from the movie industry.

There are approximately 160 homes In the area. There are Colonial-style bungalows, along some Italian, Renaissance, English, Mediterranean, Spanish, Prairie and Craftsman homes.

One early resident was Rudolph J. Berquist, a  cinematographer known for the silent films Camille  and One Night in Rome. He built his home at 1400 N Ogden Drive in 1919.

In 1993, Spaulding Square was designated a Historic Preservation Overlay Zone (HPOZ) by the city of Los Angeles.

Geography
Spaulding Square is bounded by Orange Grove Avenue on the west, Stanley Avenue on the east, Sunset Blvd on the north, and Fountain Avenue on the south.

In Media
Films shot in the neighborhood include:

 Halloween - 1530 N. Orange Grove 

 A Nightmare on Elm Street - 428 N. Genese

Notable Residents
 Lucille Ball - actress
 Hugo Haas - director

References

External links
Spaulding Square Community Website

Neighborhoods in Hollywood, Los Angeles
Neighborhoods in Los Angeles
Los Angeles Historic Preservation Overlay Zones
Populated places established in 1916